The Surface Laptop 4 is a laptop computer made by Microsoft. It is the fourth generation of Surface Laptop which launched on 13 April 2021. It succeeds the Surface Laptop 3, which was released in 2019.

Surface Laptop 4 keeps the same form design and ports as its predecessor. The machine ships with an Intel 11th gen or AMD processor. There are models with an aluminum finish alongside models with the traditional Alcantara fabric covering.

The displays are also the same as the previous models. The 13.5 inch model comes with a 2256 x 1504 resolution and the 15 inch model comes with a 2496 x 1664 resolution. Both models have the same 3:2 aspect ratio and 201 ppi.

Configuration

Features 

 An 11th Gen Intel Core i5 or i7 processors 
 An AMD Ryzen 5 or 7 Surface Edition processors
 Storage options are 1 TB, 512 GB and 256 GB, removable
 Windows Hello with IR camera for facial recognition login
 A headphone jack, a USB-C port
 Up to 19 hours battery life for either model
 427 nits screen brightness

Timeline

References

4
Computer-related introductions in 2021